The 2011–12 Liga I was the ninety-fourth season of Liga I, the top-level football league of Romania. It began on 22 July 2011 and ended on 19 May 2012. The defending champions are Oțelul Galați.

Since Romania dropped from eighth to fourteenth place in the UEFA association coefficient rankings at the end of the 2010–11 season, the league has lost its UEFA Europa League playoff round berth. Further, the champions will not directly be entered into the group stage of the UEFA Champions League any more, but rather have to begin in the third qualification round.

Teams
The league was originally expected to comprise eighteen teams, fourteen teams from the 2010–11 season and four teams eligible for promotion from the 2010–11 Liga II. However, the exact composition of the league was further affected by the licensing controversies, see below.

Four teams from the 2010–11 season were relegated to their respective 2011–12 Liga II division; these teams are Universitatea Craiova, Unirea Urziceni, Victoria Brănești and Sportul Studențesc. Unirea Urziceni were relegated just two seasons after they won the 2008–09 Liga I. It was the fastest relegation of a former champion, Unirea being also the 2009–10 Liga I runners-up. After the relegation, the team was disbanded. Universitatea Craiova was relegated for the second time in club history, ending a five-year tenure in the highest football league of Romania. After the relegation, the team was temporary excluded by FRF from all internal competitions. Victoria and Sportul was supposed to make their immediate return to the second level, but Sportul remained in Liga I after the relegation of Timișoara and Gloria Bistrița on licensing problems, see below.

The teams promoted from 2010–11 Liga II are Seria I winners Ceahlăul Piatra Neamț, Seria II winners Petrolul Ploiești and Seria I runners-up Concordia Chiajna. Ceahlăul Piatra Neamț is returning to the first division after one year, Petrolul Ploiești after seven years, while Concordia Chiajna promoted for the first time in Liga I. After Seria II runners-up Bihor Oradea were denied a Liga I licence (see below), Mioveni, third placed in Liga II respective series, was promoted instead.

Venues

Personnel and kits

Note: Flags indicate national team as has been defined under FIFA eligibility rules. Players may hold more than one non-FIFA nationality.

Managerial changes

Season events

Licensing controversies 
The start of the 2011–12 season was affected by multiple licensing controversies involving Timișoara, Gloria Bistrița and Bihor Oradea.

On 30 May 2011, the Romanian Football Federation denied licences to four 2010–11 Liga I teams, Timișoara, Gloria Bistrița, Universitatea Craiova and Victoria Brănești, while a fifth team, Unirea Urziceni, did not apply for a licence. Of these five teams, Timișoara and Gloria Bistrița had achieved qualification for the 2011–12 season on competitional grounds. A final decision by the executive committee of the FRF on the matter, particularly on the question to which league both teams will be incorporated, was scheduled for 2 June 2011, but eventually postponed to 20 June 2011. As a direct consequence from the licence denial, Timișoara were not allowed to participate in the 2011–12 UEFA Champions League.

On 6 June 2011, the FRF announced that Bihor Oradea, runners-up in the 2010–11 Liga II Seria II and therefore having earned promotion, did not meet requirements for a Liga I licence.

On 11 June 2011, a FRF communique stated that the executive committee doesn't have the power to change the Licensing Commission decisions. However, on 20 June, the FRF Executive Committee decided that for the next three years the licences will not matter for Liga I promotion. Therefore, Timișoara, Gloria Bistrița and Bihor Oradea could play in the 2011–12 Liga I season. The decision was reverted on the same day, after an intervention of FRF president, Mircea Sandu. The only chance for the three teams to play in the next season would be a favorable decision from Court of Arbitration for Sport for their appeals.

On 22 June 2011, FRF announced that Sportul Studențesc will retain their Liga I place and Mioveni will promote instead of Bihor Oradea. FRF decided also that a play-off round will be played between Săgeata Năvodari and Voința Sibiu for the last remaining place in Liga 1. On 2 July, in Săgeata Năvodari, the first match of the play-off was a goalless draw. Voința Sibiu promoted for the first time in history in Liga I after a 2–0 victory in the second match of the play-off.

On 8 July, Court of Arbitration for Sport announced that the appeals from Timișoara, Bihor and Bistrița will be heard in an expedited manner in order to have a decision before the start of the season. On 18 July, CAS announced that the appeals were dismissed. The challenged decisions taken by the competent authorities in Romania and by UEFA were confirmed in their entirety.

Home ground dilemmas 
Two of the most supported teams, Steaua București and Rapid București started the season without a contract with their traditional home grounds, Ghencea and Giulești.

The Ministry of National Defense, owner of Ghencea, denounced the contract with Steaua for unpaid debts. A new agreement is expected to be signed. Meanwhile, because Steaua's home ground was suspended for the first two stages because of the incidents in the 2010–11 Romanian Cup final and the 2011 Romanian Supercup, the team played the first two home matches at Constanța and Ploiești. Further matches was played in Ploiești and Buzău. Numerous other stadiums were considered by the Steaua owner George Becali for a new home: the new Arena Națională, CFR Cluj stadium, Buzău and Astra stadium. Ghencea owners invited Steaua to return to Ghencea, but only after the debts (around 560.000 euro) will be fully paid. However, Steaua played further matches on Astra and Buzău stadiums and National Arena. George Becali declared at the beginning of November that the team will settle on the National Arena until the end of 2011.

Rapid played the first game match on Regie, because they were suspended for the incidents created by fans during the last match of the 2010–11 Liga I. Because of debts towards CS Rapid București, owners of Giulești, they were still unable to use their traditional home stadium. CS Rapid București agreed to sign a new contract if a part of the debts were paid until the coming match of the fourth stage against Concordia Chiajna. The match was eventually played on the Nicolae Dobrin Stadium in Pitești. Before the sixth stage, Rapid president Dinu Gheorghe announced there is not yet an agreement and thus the match with FC Brașov will be played on Regie. On 12 September, a temporary accord was signed between the two parts, meaning that Rapid will return to their traditionally home ground for at least two matches. On 11 October 2011, was signed a contract for the entire season.

Investigations and arrests
On 25 September 2011, Vasile Avram, the president of Romanian Referees Commission (CCA), has been arrested on suspicion of taking bribes from a businessman close to Târgu Mureș. Further information revealed that in the same investigation are involved the presidents of other two clubs, Dinamo București and Vaslui, and the heads of Romanian Football Federation, Mircea Sandu, and Romanian Professional Football League, Dumitru Dragomir. It is still unclear how the 2011–12 Liga 1 season will be affected by these investigations. Vasile Avram was released after 58 days of arrest with some restrictions, but the process will continue. However, he was already replaced as the president of CCA with Ion Crăciunescu.

Also, in October 2011 National Anticorruption Directorate (DNA) started the investigation of the members of Romanian Football Federation Execute Committee, accusing them of abuse in the Universitatea Craiova temporary exclusion of all competition after last season relegation. Following the exclusion, all the Craiova's players was declared free of contract.

League table

Positions by round

Results

Top goalscorers

Source: Liga1.ro

Champion squad

Season statistics

Scoring
First goal of the season: Ciprian Deac for Rapid București against Vaslui (22 July 2011)
100th goal of the season: Dan Săndulescu for Mioveni against Gaz Metan Mediaș (29 August 2011)
200th goal of the season: Wesley for Vaslui against Mioveni (2 October 2011)
300th goal of the season: Paul Batin for Pandurii Târgu Jiu against Vaslui (20 November 2011)
400th goal of the season: Paíto for Vaslui against Concordia Chiajna (9 March 2012)
500th goal of the season: Dan Alexa for Rapid București against CFR Cluj (7 April 2012)
600th goal of the season: Wesley for Vaslui against Târgu Mureș (2 May 2012)
700th goal of the season: Wesley for Vaslui against Oțelul Galați (16 May 2012)
Fastest goal of the season: 11 seconds – Cristian Irimia for Sportul Studențesc against Concordia Chiajna (25 July 2011)
First own goal of the season: Rui Duarte (Rapid București) for Universitatea Cluj (30 July 2011)
First penalty kick of the season: Cristian Tănase (Steaua București) against Mioveni (31 July 2011) (not scored)
First scored penalty kick of the season: Cătălin Munteanu (Dinamo București) against Gaz Metan Mediaș (31 July 2011)
First hat-trick of the season: Adrian Cristea (Universitatea Cluj) against Gaz Metan Mediaș (1 October 2011)
Fastest hat-trick of the season: 11 minutes –  Wesley (Vaslui) against Târgu Mureș (30 October 2011)
All-time top scorers (second place): 202 – Ionel Dănciulescu (Dinamo București) (6 November 2011)
All-time top scorer (foreign player): 44 – Wesley (Vaslui) (4 December 2011)
Hat-tricks of the season:
Adrian Cristea (Universitatea Cluj) against Gaz Metan Mediaș (1 October 2011)
Wesley (Vaslui) against Mioveni (2 October 2011)
Daniel Oprița (Petrolul Ploiești) against Voința Sibiu (15 October 2011)
Marius Niculae (Dinamo București) against Ceahlăul Piatra Neamț (17 October 2011)
Wesley (Vaslui) against Târgu Mureș (30 October 2011)
Cardoso (Pandurii Târgu Jiu) against Concordia Chiajna (12 December 2011)
Wesley (Vaslui) against Ceahlăul Piatra Neamț (19 March 2012)
Hamza Younés (Petrolul Ploiești) against Concordia Chiajna (21 March 2012)
Mike Temwanjera (Vaslui) against Gaz Metan Mediaș (7 May 2012)
Bojan Golubović (Ceahlăul Piatra Neamț) against Târgu Mureș (17 May 2012)

Discipline
First yellow card of the season: Dan Alexa for Rapid București (against Vaslui) (22 July 2011)
First red card of the season: Zhivko Milanov for Vaslui (against Rapid București) (22 July 2011)
Most red cards by a team: 7 – Târgu Mureș (updated on 19 November 2011)
Fewest red cards by a team: 0 – Dinamo București
Most red cards by a player: 3 – Ionuț Voicu (Mioveni) (updated on 18 December 2011)
Most yellow cards by a team: 60 – Târgu Mureș (updated on 9 December 2011)
Fewest yellow cards by a team: 37 – Brașov (updated on 9 December 2011)
Most yellow cards by a player: 8 – Žarko Marković (Gaz Metan Mediaș), Miloš Pavlović (Vaslui), Milan Perendija (Oțelul Galați) (updated on 11 December 2011)
Fastest red card of the season: 22 seconds – Ciprian Tănasă for Mioveni (against Ceahlăul Piatra Neamț) (4 November 2011)

Penalties
Most penalties awarded for a team: 7 – Dinamo București
Most penalties awarded against a team: 5 – Ceahlăul Piatra Neamț, Concordia Chiajna
Most penalties scored by a team: 6 – Rapid București
Most penalties scored against a team: 5 – Ceahlăul Piatra Neamț
Most penalties missed by a team: 3 – Steaua București
Most penalties saved by a team: 2 – Târgu Mureș, Petrolul Ploiești

Miscellaneous
Highest transfer fee: 6 mil. Euro – Gabriel Torje from Dinamo București to Udinese (26 August 2011)
All-time matches in Liga I (fifth place): 469 – Ionel Dănciulescu (Dinamo București) (17 December 2011)
All-time matches in Liga I (sixth place): 468 – Petre Marin (Concordia Chiajna) (retired in the midseason)
Winter champions: Dinamo București

References

External links

 Official website

Liga I seasons
Romania
1